Anita Paillamil is a Mapuche research and master weaver who is best known for her weaving work in the exhibit "Encoded Textiles"  She was selected as a part of the Smithsonian Institute's Artist Leadership Initiative and she was honored in 2014 by the World Fair Trade Organization for her contributions to the preservation and research on textile art.

Paillamil is from Nueva Imperial. She was part of Fundación Chol Chol, a fair trade organization dedicated to the indigenous Mapuche communities.

In 2012, Paillamil worked with Chilean artist Guillermo Bert to create his work "Encoded Textiles," which combined traditional mapuche weaving with QR Code designs and was displayed in Pasadena Museum of California Art. In 2014, she was a participant Smithsonian Institution National Museum of the American Indian's Artist Leadership Program and traveled to the Smithsonian Institute to research Mapuche photographs, textiles and iconography and then share her research with the Indigenous Association Wallontu Witral cooperative, located near Temuco, Chile. During her research, she had also helped reclassify certain items in the Smithsonian Collection. In 2015, Paillamil presented her weaving and represented Chile at the World Expo in Milan.

In 2021, her work was displayed in the exhibit “Meli Newen – Cuatro Fuerzas,” which was sponsored by Temuco Catholic University and a part of their COVID-19 pandemic art initiative “Tejido de Fraternidad.”

Paillamil is the president of the Asociación Newen Ngürrekafe, an organization dedicated to serving women weavers from the Bío-Bío and Araucanía regions.

Resources

External Sources 
 "Artist Anita Paillamil empowers other Mapuche women by reconnecting them with their culture" - Paillamil from her time at the Smithsonian Institution's Artist Leadership Program
 "Una mujer tejedora en la cultura mapuche" - Paillamil's 2018 presentation at TEDxUTCInacap

Living people
Chilean artists
21st-century textile artists
People from Nueva Imperial
Chilean women artists
Year of birth missing (living people)